The Wellington Guide was a Wellington, New Zealand-based lifestyle magazine.  It had an Auckland edition, The Auckland Guide. The magazine ceased publication in 2011.

References

2011 disestablishments in New Zealand
Defunct magazines published in New Zealand
Local interest magazines
Magazines with year of establishment missing
Magazines disestablished in 2011
Mass media in Wellington
Magazines published in New Zealand
City guides